The  is a class of Japanese C-B wheel arrangement diesel-hydraulic locomotives. 708 locomotives were built between 1966 and 1978. , 138 locomotives remained in operation.

Variants

DE10-0 subclass
158 DE10-0 locomotives were built with steam heating boilers for passenger use.

None of this subclass remains in use on JR, but several examples operate on private railways. DE10 1 is preserved at JR Shikoku's Tadotsu depot.

DE10-500 subclass
74 DE10-500 locomotives were built from 1968 with concrete ballast in place of the steam heating boilers for freight use. None of this subclass remains in use on JR, but several examples operate on private railways.

DE10-900 subclass
One prototype locomotive, DE10 901, was built in 1967 as a heavy shunting locomotive with ballasting increasing the weight to 70 tonnes. This formed the basis for the Class DE11 design.

DE10-1000 subclass
210 DE10-1000 locomotives were built from 1969 with steam heating boilers and uprated DML61ZB engines offering .

DE10-1500 subclass
265 DE10-1500 locomotives were built from 1969 with uprated DML61ZB engines and concrete ballast in place of the steam heating boilers for freight use.

DE10-3000/3500 subclass

JR Freight shunting locomotives rebuilt in 2009 from former JR East Class DE15 snow-plough locomotives. The conversion histories and former identities of this sub-class are as follows.

Preserved examples
 DE10 1: Previously stored at JR Shikoku Tadotsu depot, and scheduled to be preserved at the Shikoku Railway Heritage Museum from July 2014

Related classes
 Class DE11 heavy shunting locomotive
 Class DE15 snowplough propulsion unit

Classification

The DE10 classification for this locomotive type is explained below.
 D: Diesel locomotive
 E: Five driving axles
 10: Locomotive with maximum speed of 85 km/h or less

References

 

Diesel locomotives of Japan
DE10
DE10
DE10
DE10
DE10
DE10
DE10
Kawasaki diesel locomotives
1067 mm gauge locomotives of Japan
C-B locomotives
Railway locomotives introduced in 1966